Bachatsky is an urban locality (an urban-type settlement) under the administrative jurisdiction of Belovo Town Under Oblast Jurisdiction in Kemerovo Oblast, Russia, located  north of Belovo and  southeast of Kemerovo, on the border of the Salair Ridge and the Kuznetsk Basin, between the Bolshoy (Chernovoy) Bachat and Maly (Stepnoy) Bachat Rivers. Population:

References

Urban-type settlements in Kemerovo Oblast